Robert Barbour may refer to:

 Robert Barbour (New South Wales politician) (1827–1895), Australian politician, merchant and squatter
 Robert Barbour (Victorian politician) ( 1845–1914), Australian politician
 Robert Barbour (RAF officer) (1895–1980), Scottish World War I flying ace
 Robert Barbour (cricketer) (1899–1994), Australian cricketer
 Robert Barbour (minister) (1921–2014), Church of Scotland minister and author